Ace of Swords is a card used in Latin suited playing cards (Italian, Spanish and tarot decks). It is the ace from the suit of swords.

Card Reading
The Rider–Waite divinatory meaning of this card suggests: triumph, the excessive degree in everything, conquest, triumph of force. It is a card of great force, in love as well as in hatred: it can indicate great prosperity or great misery. Reversed - the same but the results are disastrous.

See also

Suit of Swords
https://www.tarot.com/tarot/cards/ace-of-swords